The men's synchronized 10 metre platform competition of the diving events at the 2011 World Aquatics Championships was held on July 17 with the preliminary round held in the morning and the final in the evening session.

Medalists

Results

The preliminary round was held at 10:00 local time. The final was held at 17:05.

Green denotes finalists

References

External links
2011 World Aquatics Championships: Men's 10 m synchro platform entry list, from OmegaTiming.com; retrieved 2011-07-16.

Men's 10 m synchro platform